Peter Lübeke (26 November 1952 – 22 July 2022) was a German professional footballer who played as a midfielder or forward for Hamburger SV, 1. FC Saarbrücken, Bayer Uerdingen, Hércules CF, Ajax and Eintracht Braunschweig.

Lübeke died on 22 July 2022, at the age of 69.

References

External links 
 
 
 
 Peter Lübeke at Voetbal International 

1952 births
2022 deaths
People from Perleberg
German footballers
Footballers from Brandenburg
Association football midfielders
La Liga players
Eredivisie players
Bundesliga players
2. Bundesliga players
Hamburger SV players
1. FC Saarbrücken players
KFC Uerdingen 05 players
Hércules CF players
AFC Ajax players
Eintracht Braunschweig players
German expatriate footballers
German expatriate sportspeople in the Netherlands
Expatriate footballers in the Netherlands
German expatriate sportspeople in Spain
Expatriate footballers in Spain
20th-century German people